Droitwich Spa railway station serves the town of Droitwich Spa in Worcestershire, England. It is located just to the south-west of Droitwich Spa Junction of the Worcester to Leamington Spa Line and the Worcester to Birmingham New Street line. The station is managed by West Midlands Trains, who also operate all trains serving it.

History
Droitwich Spa railway station was opened in 1852 (then called simply 'Droitwich') as part of the Oxford-Worcester-Wolverhampton Line by the Oxford, Worcester and Wolverhampton Railway, which was soon to come under the auspices of the Great Western Railway. 

Plans for a new station began around 1892. The Great Western Railway company put the construction of the new station out to tender in 1897 and the contractor was Mr. Bloxham. It was constructed on land given by John Corbett and the construction cost around £7,000. The new station was opened on 3 June 1899 and this fulfilled the demands of providing accommodation for 200,000 passengers annually using the 16 G.W.R. trains and 12 Midland Railway trains in each direction per day. It was in 1899 that the 'Spa' suffix was added. 

The station was linked into the Midland Railway's main line between Birmingham New Street and Gloucester by means of a short branch line to Stoke Works Junction, south of Bromsgrove.  This also allowed trains from the Worcester direction to run to New Street (by means of running powers over MR metals) as well as the GWR station at Snow Hill.  Originally built as a double line, it was singled in 1969 when Gloucester Power Signal Box took over control of the main line south of Barnt Green.

Stationmasters

Edward David Wilson 1852- 1868 (afterwards station master at Brecon)
Thomas Wainwright 1868 - 1873 (formerly station master at Pershore, afterwards station master at Evesham)
Charles Joseph Richard 1873 - 1878
Walter Knee 1878 - 1913
Amos Pasco 1913 - 1917
L.G. Farmer 1926 - 1938 (formerly station master at Charlbury)
Walter G. Taylor 1938 - 1942

Services

The service pattern from the station has varied somewhat over the years, particularly after most services via Kidderminster were diverted to New St in 1967 as part of the plans to close Snow Hill (the service via Bromsgrove subsequently becoming peak-hours only). Today though, travellers from the station once again have a choice of stations in Birmingham following the reopening of Snow Hill in 1995 and there are regular services on both routes into the city.

Currently there is an hourly service (Mon - Sat) between New St and Hereford via Bromsgrove that calls here, along with two trains per hour between Snow Hill and Worcester (both stations). The latter continue beyond Snow Hill eastbound to either Whitlocks End or Dorridge, whilst some trains run through to/from Great Malvern. The frequency on this line drops to hourly in the evenings.
On Sundays, the Worcester - Snow Hill service runs every hour, continuing eastbound to Shirley and Stratford-upon-Avon, whilst there is only a limited service (five trains each way) between New St and Worcester/Hereford.

As of January 2016 the typical weekday off-peak service from the station is:

2tph (trains per hour) to Worcester (some services go via or terminate at )

Services on the Snow Hill Line are generally served by Class 172 DMUs and services on the Hereford Line are normally served by Class 170s.

Droitwich Spa Junction 

Droitwich Spa Junction is a railway junction located 250 metres (800 ft) north-east of the station.

The junction sees the Birmingham to Worcester via Bromsgrove Line branch off from the main line - the Birmingham to Worcester via Kidderminster Line. Part of this line is a surviving section of the Oxford-Worcester-Wolverhampton Line and is these days used by trains heading towards Kidderminster, Stourbridge Junction and Birmingham Snow Hill. The branch meanwhile joins the main Birmingham to Bristol line at Stoke Works Junction, south of Bromsgrove - services over this line then continue via the famous Lickey Incline en route to Birmingham New Street.

Droitwich Spa signal box controls the junction and is located between the diverging lines. The whole of the junction is controlled by semaphore signals from the British Rail Western Region era.  The box interfaces with the West Midlands Signal Control Centre, Stourbridge Desk (at Saltley) on the main line towards Kidderminster and West Midlands Signal Control Centre, Bromsgrove Desk (at Saltley) on the branch, using the Track Circuit Block system - the latter becomes a single line just beyond the junction and remains so until joining the main line at Stoke Works.  To the south, the next box is located at Worcester Tunnel Junction, north of Worcester Shrub Hill, signalled via the Absolute Block system.

References

Further reading

External links

Rail Around Birmingham and the West Midlands: Droitwich Spa station
MIAC: Droitwich Spa
West Midlands Railway: Station Information

Droitwich Spa
Railway stations in Worcestershire
DfT Category E stations
Former Great Western Railway stations
Railway stations in Great Britain opened in 1852
Railway stations served by West Midlands Trains
1852 establishments in England